John Trevor Thompson (21 May 1955 – December 2021) was an English professional footballer who played as a full-back. Active in England and the United States, Thompson made over 150 career league appearances.

Career
Born in North Shields, Thompson began his career with West Bromwich Albion; after joining the youth team, Thompson made 20 appearances for the first team between 1973 and 1976. After a spell in the North American Soccer League with the Washington Diplomats, Thompson returned to England to play with Newport County, where he made 35 appearances between 1978 and 1979. Thompson's final English league club was Lincoln City, where he made 80 league appearances between 1979 and 1982. Thompson later played non-league football with Gainsborough Trinity and Worksop Town, and managed Boston Town.

He died in December 2021, at the age of 66.

References

1955 births
2021 deaths
English footballers
Association football fullbacks
West Bromwich Albion F.C. players
Washington Diplomats (NASL) players
Newport County A.F.C. players
Lincoln City F.C. players
Gainsborough Trinity F.C. players
Worksop Town F.C. players
English Football League players
North American Soccer League (1968–1984) players
English football managers
Boston Town F.C. managers
English expatriate footballers
English expatriate sportspeople in the United States
Expatriate soccer players in the United States